The Second Reformed Church of Hackensack is a church in Hackensack, New Jersey located at the intersections of Anderson, Union and Ward Streets. The church is a member of the Reformed Church in America. Some of Louis Comfort Tiffany's favorite stained glass windows are at the church. Tiffany would bring clients to the church to help them select from the church's broad designs. There are 10 Tiffany windows ranging in design from realistic styles to impressionistic styles.

History
The congregation was created on October 31, 1855. The first services were held in the First Reformed Dutch Church, Hackensack. The building was erected starting on July 30, 1856 on the corner of State and Berry Streets. The land had been donated by Maria Berry and her family. The cornerstone was laid by Reverend John Knox from Manhattan, New York City. The construction was completed in 1857.

This first building was destroyed in a fire on April 15, 1907. The church had just celebrated its 50th anniversary of its completion the previous month. They had made their last mortgage payment. The fire started at a nearby carpenter's shop. The interior of the church had just been redecorated.

The cornerstone of the present church building was laid on June 21, 1908. The building had a parsonage that has been sold. The church is constructed of native field stones from the stone walls of nearby farms. In 1965 an administrative wing was added to the church.

In 1991 the New Community Church of Teaneck was merged into the Second Reformed Church.

Pastors
The pastors are as follows:

Windows
The Second Reformed Church is famous for its Tiffany glass windows. One example is The Angels of Praise, a large window that was part of the 1893 International Exhibition in Chicago.

See also 
First Reformed Dutch Church, Hackensack

References

External links

Hackensack, New Jersey
Reformed Church in America churches in New Jersey
1855 establishments in New Jersey